The para (from Persian , pâre, 'piece'; Cyrillic: пара) was a former currency of the Ottoman Empire, Turkey, Egypt, Montenegro, Albania and Yugoslavia and is the current subunit, although rarely used, of the Serbian dinar.

In 1524, the Ottoman law code of Egypt (kanunname) referred to the Mamluk Egyptian coin medin as pare and set its value as  dirham. Since 1640 the value of para was settled relative to Ottoman currency, at 3 akçe. In the 16th and 17th centuries pare were minted in many parts of the empire, in Asia and north Africa. In 1688 the Ottoman kuruş was introduced, equalling 40 para. In 1844, a kuruş was, in turn,  of the newly introduced Ottoman lira.

The modern Turkish lira is only divided into . 

In Serbia, the  has been the subunit of the dinar since the 19th century. The Montenegrin perper was subdivided into 100  during its brief existence between 1906 and 1918.

References 

Modern obsolete currencies
Coins of Turkey
Currencies of Serbia
Coins of the Ottoman Empire
Currencies of Yugoslavia